Adair County is a county located in the northeastern part of the U.S. state of Missouri. The population census for 2020 was 25,314.  As of July 1, 2021, the U.S. Census Bureau's Population Estimates for the county is 25,185, a -0.5% change. Adair county seat is Kirksville. The county was first settled by immigrants from Kentucky and organized on January 29, 1841. Adair County comprises the Kirksville, MO Micropolitan Statistical Area.

History
The first permanent settlement in Adair County began in 1828. Many of the first settlers were from Adair County in Kentucky, for which the Missouri county was named. The county in Kentucky was named for John Adair, a respected Governor of Kentucky. This was 25 years after the Louisiana Purchase, seven years after Missouri was granted statehood, and four years after the Sac and Fox Native American tribes surrendered their claims to the land.

The Big Neck War: In July 1829, a large party of Iowa (or Ioway) Native Americans, led by Chief Big Neck, returned to their former hunting grounds in violation of treaty. One of the Ioway's dogs killed a pig, and some tribe members threatened (or insulted, according to some sources) the white women. The settlers sent messengers south to Randolph and Macon counties asking for help. Captain William Trammell responded with a party of some two dozen men to help. By the time of their arrival, the Ioways had left the area and moved up the Chariton into what is now Schuyler County. Trammell's force, augmented by several of the men from The Cabins, pursued and engaged the Ioway at a place called Battle Creek, killing several Native Americans including Big Neck's brother, sister-in-law, and their child. The Trammell party lost three men in the skirmish, including Captain Trammell himself, and one additional casualty died of his wounds shortly afterward. The surviving whites returned to the cabins, collected the women and children, and headed south for the Randolph County settlement of Huntsville. Later, a group of militia under General John B. Clark pursued and apprehended Big Neck and his braves, capturing them in March 1830. Several of them soon escaped from jail and fled to the current state of Iowa; however, Big Neck himself and the remainder were put on trial by a grand jury convened in Randolph County. The jury found on March 31, 1830, that: "After examining all the witnesses, and maturely considering the charges for which these Iowa Indians are now in confinement, we find them not guilty, and they are at once discharged." The acquittal of Big Neck seemed to have brought the war to a peaceful, if uneasy, conclusion. A few months later, white settlers returned to The Cabins in greater numbers than before, and this time to stay permanently. The outbreak of the Blackhawk War in 1832 again caused consternation among the early settlers although all fighting was hundreds of miles away in present-day Illinois and Wisconsin. To ease fears in the area, militia units were dispatched and two small forts were constructed. One, Fort Clark, was located on high ground adjacent to The Cabins. Several miles to the northeast, another detachment of troops established Fort Matson. After months of no hostile Native American activity in the Adair County area, both forts were abandoned. The site of Fort Clark is now marked by a large boulder and plaque, while the Fort Matson site was later the location for a church and its name corrupted to Fort Madison (not to be confused with the Iowa city). The Fort Matson/Madison Cemetery still remains.

Courthouse
The Adair County courthouse is a three-story Romanesque structure in the center of the Kirksville city square that was completed in 1899. The architect was Robert G. Kirsch who would later also design the courthouses for Carroll, Polk, Vernon, and Cooper counties. The county had no dedicated courthouse from 1865 until 1899, operating out of temporary rented quarters on or near the square. The county voters finally approved a $50,000 bond issue in 1897 to build the current courthouse after four failed attempts between 1872 and 1896. The courthouse was placed on the National Register of Historic Places in 1978.

Geography

Adjacent counties
Putnam County  (northwest)
Schuyler County  (north)
Scotland County  (northeast)
Knox County  (east)
Macon County  (south)
Linn County (southwest)
Sullivan County  (west)

Major highways
 U.S. Route 63
 Route 3
 Route 6
 Route 11
 Route 149

Demographics

As of the census of 2000, there were 24,977 people, 9,669 households, and 5,346 families residing in the county. The population density was 44 people per square mile (17/km2). There were 10,826 housing units at an average density of 19 per square mile (7/km2). The racial makeup of the county was 95.82% White, 1.20% Black or African American, 0.26% Native American, 1.39% Asian, 0.05% Pacific Islander, 0.41% from other races, and 0.88% from two or more races. Approximately 1.26% of the population were Hispanic or Latino of any race.

There were 9,669 households, out of which 25.20% had children under the age of 18 living with them, 45.50% were married couples living together, 7.20% had a female householder with no husband present, and 44.70% were non-families. 31.50% of all households were made up of individuals, and 10.50% had someone living alone who was 65 years of age or older. The average household size was 2.29 and the average family size was 2.90.

In the county, the population was spread out, with 19.20% under the age of 18, 27.40% from 18 to 24, 22.80% from 25 to 44, 18.40% from 45 to 64, and 12.30% who were 65 years of age or older. The median age was 28 years. For every 100 females, there were 88.20 males. For every 100 females age 18 and over, there were 84.50 males.

The median income for a household in the county was $26,677, and the median income for a family was $38,085. Males had a median income of $26,323 versus $21,837 for females. The per capita income for the county was $15,484. About 11.90% of families and 23.30% of the population were below the poverty line, including 16.80% of those under age 18 and 12.00% of those age 65 or over.

Religion
According to the Association of Religion Data Archives County Membership Report (2010), Adair County is sometimes regarded as being on the northern edge of the Bible Belt, with evangelical Protestantism being the most predominant religion. The most predominant denominations among residents in Adair County who adhere to a religion are Southern Baptists (19.73%), United Methodists (14.27%), and Roman Catholics (12.72%).

2020 census

Education

Public schools
Adair County R-I School District - Novinger
Adair County R-I Elementary School (K-06)
Adair County R-I High School (07-12)
Adair County R-II School District - Brashear
Adair County R-II Elementary School (K-06)
Adair County R-II High School (07-12)
Kirksville R-III School District - Kirksville
Kirksville Primary School (PK-02)
Ray Miller Elementary School (03-05)
Kirksville Middle School (06-08)
Kirksville High School (09-12)
 La Plata R-2 School District - La Plata
− ** La Plata R-2 Elementary School (K-06)
− ** La Plata R-2 High School (07-12)
− ** The La Plata R-2 facilities are located in La Plata, Missouri, in northern Macon County, Missouri, however the district boundaries encompass part of southern Adair County as well.

Private schools
Mary Immaculate Catholic School - Kirksville - (K-08) - Roman Catholic
Life Church School - Kirksville - (K-12) - Nondenominational Christianity

Post-secondary education
 A.T. Still University - Kirksville - (Kirksville College of Osteopathic Medicine) - Satellite Campus
Truman State University - Kirksville - A public, four-year university. 
 Moberly Area Community College - Kirksville - A satellite campus of the main community college in Moberly

Public libraries
Adair County Public Library

Politics

Local
Adair County is governed by a three-member commission. The presiding commissioner is elected by the county voters at large. The first district and second district commissioners are voted on by the residents living in the eastern half of the county, and western half of the county respectively. Each commissioner has an equal vote in all county business. Most offices are housed in the Adair County Courthouse, a structure dating from 1896 and listed on the National Register of Historic Places. The Adair County Sheriff's Office is located in the Adair County Detention Center one block north of the courthouse, while the Prosecuting Attorney's office resides in the County Annex building across from the detention center.

The Republican Party controls politics at the local level in Adair County. Republicans hold all but four of the elected positions in the county.

State

Adair County is split between two legislative districts in the Missouri House of Representatives, both of which are held by Republicans.

District 3 — Danny Busick (R-Newtown). Consists of the city of Kirksville and the western half of the rest of the county.
District 4 — Greg Sharpe (R-Ewing). Consists of the eastern half of the county.

All of Adair County is a part of Missouri's 18th District in the Missouri Senate and is currently represented by Cindy O'Laughlin (R-Shelbina).

Communities

Cities
Brashear
Greentop (mostly in Schuyler County)
Kirksville (county seat)
Novinger

Villages
Gibbs
Millard

Unincorporated communities

 Adair
 Bullion
 Clay
 Connelsville
 Danforth
 Fegley
 Nind
 Nineveh
 Paultown
 Ringo Point
 Shibleys Point
 Sperry
 Stahl
 Sublette
 Troy Mills
 Willmathsville
 Yarrow
 Youngstown

Townships
Adair County is divided into ten townships:

 Benton
 Clay
 Liberty
 Morrow
 Nineveh
 Pettis
 Polk
 Salt River
 Walnut
 Wilson

See also
National Register of Historic Places listings in Adair County, Missouri
List of counties in Missouri

References

External links
 Adair County Government
 Adair County Historical Society
 Digitized 1930 Plat Book of Adair County  from University of Missouri Division of Special Collections, Archives, and Rare Books
 Adair County Sheriff's Office

 
1841 establishments in Missouri
Missouri counties
Kirksville micropolitan area, Missouri